Lucky Akhand (7 June 1956 – 21 April 2017) was a Bangladeshi singer-composer. He was associated with the musical band Happy Touch. He composed and gave vocal to songs including Ei Neel Monihar, Aamay Deko Na, Agey Jodi Janitam, Riti Niti Janina, Polatok Am, Abar Elo Jey Shondhya Porichoy Kobe hobe, Aj achhi kal nei, Hotath kore Bangladesh, Bolechhile kal tumi asbe, Tumi ke bolona, Mamonia, and Shadhinota Tomake Niye. He served as the music director of Bangladeshi national radio network Bangladesh Betar.

Early life
Akhand got music lessons at the age of five from his father. He performed in music programs for children on television and radio during 1963–1967. He was enlisted as a music composer of HMV Pakistan when he was 14 and a musician of HMV India at 16. He won the first prize in 'Modern Bangla Songs' category in 1969 from the Pakistan Art Council. He was an artist of Swadhin Bangla Betar Kendra, the radio broadcasting center of Bangladesh Government formed for Liberation Struggle during the Bangladesh Liberation War in 1971.

Career

Akhand started his career with self-titled solo album Lucky Akhand in 1984 under the banner of Sargam. Some of the notable songs of that album are "Agey Jodi Jantam", "Amay Dekona", "Mamonia", "Ei Neel Monihar" and "Hridoy Amar". He composed songs for the album of his brother in which "Abar Elo Je Sondha" and "Ke Bashi Bajaire" sung by Happy Akhand, "Shadhinota Tomake Niye" and "Pahari Jhorna" sung by Happy Akhand and himself and "Nil Nil Shari Pore" and "Hothat Kore Bangladesh" sung by himself are notable songs. Lucky was the music composer and also gave vocal to "Abar Elo Je Sondha" (main vocal was by Happy Akhand) and other songs in the Bangla film named Ghuddi in 1980.

Akhand stopped his career after the death of his younger brother Happy Akhand in 1987. He returned after a decade with two albums named Porichoy Kobe Hobe and Bitrishna Jibone Amar in 1998. Porichoy Kobe Hobe was his second solo album and the remake of his brother Happy Akhand's solo album. Bitrishna Jibone Amar was a band and modern mix album. Six singers Tapan Chowdhury, Kumar Biswajit, Samina Chowdhury, Ayub Bachchu, James, and Hasan sang together in this album. In the same year, he composed a duet album named Ananda Chokh with the lyrics of Golam Morshed and under the banner of Soundtrack. Akhand composed a solo album of Samina Chowdhury named Amay Dekona in 1999. He also composed the song "Hridoyer Durdine Jacche Khora" for the album Dekha Hobe Bondhu by the band Ark. He composed another mixed album after 2000. The album was named Tomar Oronne. Bappa Mazumder, Nipu, Fahmida Nabi and himself contributed 10 songs. He used contemporary rhythm, folk fusion and his always favorite Spanish fusion in that album.

Discography

Solo

Duet
ty

Mixed

Only composition

Film scores

Personal life and death

Akhand had a daughter Mum Minti. In 2015, he was diagnosed with grade-IV lung cancer. He was treated in Bangabandhu Sheikh Mujib Medical University and in a hospital in Bangkok, Thailand. He was moved to his residence in Armanitola, Dhaka in early April 2017 at Mitford Hospital, Dhaka. He died on 21 April. He was buried at Martyred Intellectuals Graveyard in Mirpur.

Tribute 

On 7 June 2019, on Akhand's 63rd birthday, he was honored with a Google Doodle.

References

External links

 

1956 births
2017 deaths
People from Dhaka
Bangladeshi male musicians
Burials at Mirpur Martyred Intellectual Graveyard
Bangladeshi guitarists
Deaths from lung cancer in Bangladesh